Josef Krysta (born 24 October 1956) is a Czech wrestler. He competed at the 1976 Summer Olympics and the 1980 Summer Olympics.

References

External links
 

1956 births
Living people
Czech male sport wrestlers
Olympic wrestlers of Czechoslovakia
Wrestlers at the 1976 Summer Olympics
Wrestlers at the 1980 Summer Olympics
People from Český Těšín
Sportspeople from the Moravian-Silesian Region